Colwick Country Park is a country park in Colwick, Nottingham, England.

History
The estate upon which the park resides dates back to 1362. The current house, Colwick Hall, was built in the late 18th century and is now a privately-owned hotel. The Country Park opened in 1978, with former gravel workings being landscaped and planted to form a recreational facility for Nottingham. A new visitor centre facility is planned.

Facilities
West Lake is home to the Nottingham City Open Water Swimming Centre with organised swimming sessions (with swimming not permitted at other times), it is also stocked with carp for fishing and has canoeing and sailing. There are educational facilities, children's play areas, wildlife areas, dog walking, orienteering, geocaching, bird watching and wildlife photography, cycling, horse riding and ranger led activities. There is a centre with activities including power boating, camp crafts and windsurfing. A Parkrun takes place every Saturday morning at 9am, except during pandemics, comprising one lap of Main Lake and two laps of West Lake. There is also a marina for mooring at the River Trent.

Fauna and flora
The Racecourse and Pool is a Site of Special Scientific Interest due to its dragonfly species, this site has recorded 16 species of dragonfly with 14 species breeding. There are around 220 recorded species of birds.

References

Country parks in England
Country parks in Nottinghamshire